Tehransar is a neighborhood in western Tehran, the capital of Iran. It is part of municipality region 21, and is home to some of Tehran's richest companies, such as Iran Khodro, Saipa Group, Pars Khodro, Arj, Kerman Khodro, Shahabkhodro,  Iran Tire, Minoo Industrial Group, Daroogar, Pars electric, Daroopakhsh, Loghman and  BMW Iran - Nouriani Enterprise.

The most famous part of the area is 14th Street (Tehransar). This street contains Tehransar's newest shopping center and many popular locales, including top-end shops and chichi cafes.

Before Tehransar was officially incorporated into the city of Tehran, the area consisted of expansive residences and villas used as summer homes for wealthy residents of Tehran. Today, however, most of those villas have been replaced by residential towers.

Most of the land in this district once belonged to National Iranian Oil Company, known to be the richest company in Iran .

Neighbourhoods in Tehran